Delco Hi-Q, formerly Scott's Hi-Q, or just Hi-Q is an academic quiz competition.

History
Delco Hi-Q is the oldest continuous academic quiz competition in the United States. It was started as radio quiz program for high school students in Delaware County, Pennsylvania by the Scott Paper Company, which ran it as a community relations program. "Hi" represented "High School" and "Q" represented "I.Q." The first prize in 1948 was a $1,000 "auditorium style" television set. Robert O. Johnson served as the first Quizmaster. During the early years of Hi-Q, contests were broadcast on radio station WPWA 1590.

Questions were designed to test the general knowledge that students received in the classroom. Over the years, new reference materials were added and students began to answer questions based on specific categories and reference works.

Teams were initially composed of four students for each school; teams were subsequently expanded to six students and then to the current eight-member team.  Drawn from three elements, SCOTT, High School, and I.Q., the program was known from the beginning as Scott's Hi-Q. The success of Scott's Hi-Q in Delaware County led Scott Paper to introduce the program across the country. Hi-Q National Director, Donna Zerby, helped the competition expand in 1976 to Washington State, in 1977 to Wisconsin/Michigan, in 1982 to Maine, in 1984 to Arkansas, and in 1987 to Alabama.

After the merger of Scott Paper with Kimberly-Clark in 1997, the program was turned over to longtime director, Donna Zerby. She partnered with the Delaware County Chamber of Commerce to provide stable funding for the program. Kimberly-Clark Corporation-Chester Operations became the primary corporate sponsor and the twenty-one area high schools began financially contributing to the program. Other sponsors and supporters began contributing. Donna Zerby also continued her involvement with Hi-Q on a national level, serving as an independent consultant to those locations. The Delaware County program dropped the Scott Paper name and renamed the program Delco Hi-Q.

Delaware County Intermediate Unit (DCIU) and The Foundation of the Delaware County Chamber entered into a joint sponsorship agreement in 2004 to co-sponsor Delco Hi-Q. DCIU is responsible for providing a Quizmaster, Program Director, as well as the technical services needed to run and manage the program. The Foundation is responsible for soliciting contributions for the program, collecting entrance fees, administering funds, supplies, and conducts the annual awards ceremony. Franklin Mint Federal Credit Union joined Kimberly-Clark as a primary corporate sponsor in 2004 with an initial five year, $75,000 commitment.

Franklin Mint Federal Credit Union  joined Delco Hi-Q as a primary corporate sponsor in 2004 and made a long-term commitment to strengthen and sponsor the program and the Partners in Education Celebration. DCIU and Franklin Mint Federal Credit Union started the Delco Hall of Honor in the same year. Its purpose is to honor past participants and supporters and to provide role models for current Hi-Q participants Another new tradition began in 2005, DCIU and FMFCU partnered with the Delaware County Daily Times to start the tradition of the All Delco Hi-Q Team.  Donna Zerby was the first inductee into the Hall of Honor and considered it the greatest honor of her career.

The Partners in Education Celebration was started in 2005. What was once a luncheon honoring the three top teams, became a 600-person banquet honoring all of the Delco Hi-Q participants. The dinner is held annually and is presented by the Foundation and DCIU. Alex Trebek served as the guest speaker and 6ABC's Action News anchor Rick Williams was master of ceremonies for the first celebration.

After the passing of Donna in 2005, Ginger Beaumont agreed to serve as director for the 2005/06 season. Ginger had previously spent six years coordinating the Delaware County program under the direction of Mrs. Zerby. The 2005/06 season was dedicated in memory of Donna and her 42-year association with Hi-Q.

In 2006, Franklin Mint Federal Credit Union signed an agreement with DCIU to provide question resources and Program Directors to Delco Hi-Q. Ginger Beaumont remained with Hi-Q and serves as Co-Director with Rick Durante of FMFCU.FMFCU Foundation provides question resources to all locations.

In 2008, Delaware County Intermediate Unit and Franklin Mint Federal Credit Union became co-sponsors of the program. Franklin Mint Federal Credit Union Foundation manages the program.

Hi-Q competitions still take place in Washington, Wisconsin, Alabama, and Pennsylvania, each with different sponsoring organizations. In 1979, Tom McCarthy began his 39-season run as Quizmaster. Rick Durante, Executive Director Franklin Mint Federal Credit Union Foundation, now serves as Quizmaster and Director of the competition.

Contest Information
Twenty-one Delaware County high schools participate in Delco Hi-Q.

Each school team is composed of up to ten students. 
Each school hosts one contest during the standard season.

Questions are prepared from 14 subjects, including: Art History, Biology, Chemistry, Current Events, Geography, Literature, Mathematics, Physics, Shakespeare, Sports, U.S. Government, U.S. History, and World History. Questions are selected from standard high school scholastic curricula, general scholastic knowledge, or from reference materials provided.

Each high school team competes in three matches each season, excluding possible semi-final and championship appearances.  Each match consists of three competing teams.  Each match is hosted by one of the participating teams competing in that match.  Matches are typically held in the high school auditorium on stage, before an audience of students, teachers, faculty, and community members.  Questions are read aloud by the Quizmaster, and at times team members use buzzers to answer questions. Points awarded throughout the season accumulate and determine semi-final and championship entry eligibility.

The highest-scoring team at the end of the regular season automatically becomes a participant in the Championship Match and does not compete in the Semifinals. The Semifinal Round is a six-team competition. From points accumulated during the regular season, the second highest-scoring team will play teams in positions six and seven. The third highest-scoring team will play teams in positions four and five. In the single-contest Championship Match, the two semifinal winners compete against the highest-scoring team from the standard season. All teams start at zero in the semifinal and the championship match.

Delco Hi-Q participants are honored at the annual "Partners in Education" dinner in May. Guest speakers have included celebrities such as Alex Trebek, Ken Jennings, and John Allen Paulos.

Awards
In the Delco Hi-Q Championship Match, first, second and third place teams win cash awards for their schools of $3,000, $2,500 and $2,000 respectively.

A revolving trophy is presented annually to the Champion for display by that school throughout the next season. A permanent award is also presented to the top school. Individually engraved plaques are awarded to each school. Franklin Mint Federal Credit Union and Kimberly-Clark Corporation Chester Operations sponsor awards for each team.

The Partners in Education Celebration was started in 2005. What was once a luncheon honoring the three top teams, became a 600-person banquet honoring all of the Delco Hi-Q participants. The dinner is held annually and is presented by the Foundation and DCIU. Jeopardy host Alex Trebek served as the guest speaker and 6ABC's Action News anchor Rick Williams was master of ceremonies for the first celebration.

DCIU and Franklin Mint Federal Credit Union started the Delco Hall of Honor in the same year. Its purpose is to honor past participants and supporters and to provide role models for current Hi-Q participants Another new tradition began in 2005, DCIU and FMFCU partnered with the Delaware County Daily Times to start the tradition of the All Delco Hi-Q Team. Donna Zerby was the first inductee into the Hall of Honor and considered it the greatest honor of her 42-year Hi-Q career.

After the passing of Donna in 2005, Ginger Beaumont agreed to serve as director for the 2005/06 season. Mrs. Beaumont had previously spent six years coordinating the Delaware County program under the direction of Mrs. Zerby. The 2005/06 season was dedicated in memory of Donna and her 42-year association with Hi-Q. The revolving championship trophy was renamed the "Donna Zerby Trophy."

In 2006, Franklin Mint Federal Credit Union signed an agreement with DCIU to provide question resources and Program Directors to Delco Hi-Q. Ginger Beaumont remained with Hi-Q and served as Co-Director with Rick Durante of FMFCU until 2007.

In 2008, Delaware County Intermediate Unit and Franklin Mint Federal Credit Union became co-sponsors of the program.

As of the 2018/19 Season Rick Durante of Franklin Mint Federal Credit Union serves as Director and Quizmaster, Danielle Griffin is Assistant Director, and production engineer is Dave Bramble from Delaware County Intermediate Unit.

In addition to the participating schools’ support, primary corporate sponsors are Franklin Mint Federal Credit Union and the Wilbur C. and Betty Lea Henderson Foundation  Valedictorian sponsor is Kimberly-Clark Corporation. Contributors and supporters for the 2008/2009 season are the Delaware County Daily Times.

Finalists 1949–2023
The first-, second-, and third-place finalists from 1949 to 2023 are as follows:

*The champion schools no longer participate in Hi-Q because of school mergers.

Washington State Hi-Q
Hi-Q competitions occur in Washington State, run and sponsored by Everett Community College. Currently, there are nine teams, classified by their size and athletic districts. Matches follow the same format as the Delco Hi-Q team, and Washington state champions participate in a national championship, between Pennsylvania, Wisconsin, and Alabama.

Everett Community College is the primary sponsor for the program in the Everett Region. The program also receives support from local community groups, businesses, and foundations. Additionally, participating schools contribute toward the program's funding. The Hi-Q Regional Coordinator from Everett Community College manages the program to meet objectives and ensure a positive experience for the students.

In 2012 Everett Community College dropped its funding for the Hi-Q program, but local schools have adopted the program. The program is now headed by Monroe High School. Participating schools as of October 2012 include Lynnwood High School, Edmonds Woodway High School, Henry M. Jackson High School, Archbishop Murphy High School, Stanwood High School, Meadowdale High School, Mountlake Terrace High School, Marysville Pilchuck High School, Marysville Getchell High School.

The 2020 champion was Archbishop-Murphy High School.

Wisconsin/Michigan Hi-Q
Wisconsin/Michigan Hi-Q is a high school academic quiz competition in northeastern Wisconsin and Upper Peninsula Michigan. Eighteen local high school teams compete in annual seasons consisting of three rounds of regular season competition. Hi-Q was started by the Scott Paper Company in Delaware County, Pennsylvania, and has since expanded to include Wisconsin/Michigan, Pennsylvania, Washington, and Alabama.

Eighteen high school teams each compete in three regular season rounds, each team hosting one match. After three rounds, the cumulative points for each team's three rounds of competition are used to determine a team's ranking. The top two teams automatically qualify for the finals rounds, while the third, fourth, and fifth place teams each participate in one semi-finals round hosted by the third place school. The winner of that match then proceeds to face the first and second place teams in two finals rounds, one at the first place school and another at the second place school. The winner is the regional champion and from there moves into the National Championship round against schools from Pennsylvania, Alabama, and Washington.

Wisconsin/Michigan Hi-Q is currently sponsored by Farmers and Merchants Bank and Trust in Marinette and University of Wisconsin-Marinette. Just before the 2018-2019 season, the Kimberly-Clark Corporation announced that it would no longer sponsor the academic competition. Thomas Maxwell, current Vice President of Farmers and Merchants, has promised to cover all new costs due to this lost sponsor.

The eighteen high schools that compete in Wisconsin/Menominee Hi-Q encompass Florence, Marinette and Oconto counties of Wisconsin, and also Menominee and Dickinson counties of Upper Peninsula Michigan. The member schools include:
 Beecher/Dunbar/Pembine High School
Carney-Nadeau High School
Coleman High School
Crivitz School District (Crivitz High School)
Florence High School (Wisconsin)
Gillett High School
Lena High School
Marinette High School
Menominee High School
Niagara High School
Norway-Vulcan Area Schools (Norway High School)
Oconto High School
Oconto Falls High School (Oconto Falls, Wisconsin)
Peshtigo High School
St. Thomas Aquinas Academy (Marinette, Wisconsin)
Stephenson High School
Suring High School
Wausaukee High School

These are the past regional finalists for Wisconsin/Michigan Hi-Q from 1977 to present.

The schools marked with an asterisk(*) are those that do not participate in Wisconsin/Michigan Hi-Q anymore.

National Competition 
National Competition began in 2011 and has continued to the present with the exception of the years 2013 and 2014 where no national competition was held. The Championship consists of a single match that is done via teleconference. The Wisconsin/Michigan regional championship competes in this at the UW-Green Bay-Marinette campus. Championship rounds are usually held in early April each year. The Pennsylvania champion often has also been the winners of the national competition, a streak that was broken in 2021 thanks to the heavily favored Baker High School team edging out a victory over the Thom Houghton-coached Delaware County Christian School, who won their first ever Delco championship since Hi-Q began in 1949 (first win in school history).

References

External links
  Delco Hi-Q
  Everett Washington Hi-Q
  Wisconsin Hi-Q

Student quiz competitions
Recurring events established in 1948